Kenny Bristol (born March 9, 1952) is a Guyanese professional light middle/middleweight boxer of the 1970s and '80s who won the Commonwealth light middleweight title, his professional fighting weight varied from , i.e. light middleweight to , i.e. middleweight. Kenny Bristol won the 1976 New York Golden Gloves 160 lb Open Championship. Bristol defeated Guy Kennedy of the Madison Square Boys & Girls Club in the finals to win the Championship. Bristol trained at the Police Athletic League of New York City's Wynn Center in Brooklyn, New York where his trainer was former pro boxer Richie Hill.

Bristol won a silver medal at the 1975 Pan American Games in the welterweight division, defeating Lucien Haime of Suriname, Carlos Burga of Peru and Pedro Gamarro of Venezuela before losing to Clinton Jackson of the United States in the final.

Bristol lost an opportunity to compete in the 1976 Summer Olympics when Guyana boycotted the event.

References

External links

1952 births
Light-middleweight boxers
Living people
Middleweight boxers
Welterweight boxers
Guyanese male boxers
Boxers at the 1975 Pan American Games
Pan American Games silver medalists for Guyana
Pan American Games medalists in boxing
Afro-Guyanese people
Medalists at the 1975 Pan American Games